Martinus (Greek: Μαρτίνος) or Marinus was  of the Byzantine Empire from  to 641. Martinus was the fifth son of Emperor Heraclius and Empress Martina, who was his second wife and niece. Heraclius died on 11 February 641, leaving the Byzantine Empire to Martinus' half-brother Constantine III and his elder full brother Heraclonas; Constantine III soon died of tuberculosis, though some of his partisans alleged that Martina poisoned him. One such partisan, Valentinus, led troops to Chalcedon, across the Bosporus strait from the imperial capital, Constantinople, to force Martina to install Constans II, the son of Constantine III, as co-emperor. Valentinus seized Constantinople and forced Martina to install Constans II in September/October 641, and deposed Martina, Heraclonas, and Martinus. Martinus was mutilated and exiled to Rhodes. He died soon after, possibly during the surgeries.

Life
Martinus was born to Byzantine Emperor Heraclius and Empress Martina, his second wife and niece, at an unknown date; he was likely named after his mother. Prior to taking the throne in 610, Heraclius had been married to Fabia Eudokia, with whom he had had a daughter, Eudoxia Epiphania, and a son, Constantine III. After she died in 612, to further secure the succession, Heraclius remarried, wedding his niece Martina in either 613 or 623, with the latter date considered more likely. Although this marriage was very unpopular and offended the clergy, it was very fruitful. The number and order of Heraclius' children by Martina is unsure, with sources estimating nine, 10, or 11 children. Their first two sons were disabled and therefore unable to inherit, but Heraclonas was born healthy in 626, David Tiberius in 630, and Martinus at some later time. Constantine III was raised to co-emperor in 613 (aged 9 months old), and Heraclonas in 638 (aged 12).

Martinus received the high courtly title  under Heraclius, while his elder brother David was made  (a junior imperial title which placed him on the line of succession) on 4 July 638. According to the Byzantine historian Nicephorus Gregoras, Martinus was also made  on the same day, but the later historian Emperor Constantine VII mentions only Tiberius.

According to the 7th-century historian John of Nikiu, Martinus and his brother David were involved in the banishment of Ecumenical Patriarch Pyrrhus of Constantinople to the Exarchate of Africa. However, the two princes were too young at the time to have taken an active role in any banishment and the account by John of Nikiu is so contradictory that no safe conclusions can be drawn from it.

Reign of Constantine III and Heraclonas

When Heraclius died on 11 February 641, he declared in his will that Constantine III (aged 28) and Heraclonas (aged 15) would equally co-rule the empire, but should consider Martina as their mother, and empress. The Byzantine Senate accepted Constantine III and Heraclonas as co-emperors, but rejected Martina as regent for Heraclonas. On 20/24 April or 26 May 641, Constantine died of an advanced case of tuberculosis. However, some of his supporters alleged that Martina had him poisoned, leaving her son Heraclonas as the sole ruler under her regency. In August 641, Valentinus, a general who had been loyal to Constantine before his death, led his troops to Chalcedon to force Martina to elevate Constans II, the son of Constantine, to co-emperor. A mob rose up in the city, demanding that Patriarch Pyrrhus crown Constans II as emperor, and then abdicate, to be replaced by his steward Paul II.

Valentinus' revolt and Martinus' death
In late September/October, Martina elevated Constans to co-emperor, but also raised Heraclonas brother Tiberius to co-emperor alongside them. Despite these overtures, Valentinus entered Constantinople shortly thereafter, deposed Heraclonas and Martina, and then elevated Constans to sole emperor. Heraclonas, Martina, Tiberius, and Martinus are said by John of Nikiu to have been "escorted forth with insolence". Valentinus had Martinus nose cut off, emasculated him, and then banished his family to Rhodes, where they stayed until their deaths. According to some sources, the stress of the surgery killed Martinus immediately.

References

Citations

Bibliography

Primary sources

 Chronicle of John of Nikiû
CPR XXIII 35
De Ceremoniis
SB VI 8986

Heraclian dynasty
Medieval child monarchs
Monarchs deposed as children
Year of birth unknown
640s in the Byzantine Empire
Heraclius
Byzantine exiles
Caesars (heirs apparent)
Nobilissimi
Castrated people
Sons of Byzantine emperors